River City Pride, also known as Jacksonville Pride, is an annual weekend-long pride parade and festival in Jacksonville, Florida. The event celebrates the local lesbian, gay, bisexual, and transgender (LGBT) community and their allies. Over the years the event has been held in multiple venues around the city. The current incarnation is centered in the Five Points area in the neighborhood of Riverside. An estimated 15,000 were in attendance during the 2014 celebrations.

References

External links
River City Pride — official website

LGBT events in Florida
Festivals in Florida
Pride parades in the United States
1978 establishments in Florida
Recurring events established in 1978
Tourist attractions in Jacksonville, Florida
Culture of Jacksonville, Florida
Events in Jacksonville, Florida